Surge of Power may refer to:

Surge of Power: The Stuff of Heroes – a 2004 American film
A Surge of Power (Jen Reid) 2020 – a 2020 sculpture by Marc Quinn

See also
Power surge (disambiguation)